Sorum is a 2001 South Korean horror film and the feature film debut of director Yoon Jong-chan. Starring Kim Myung-min and Jang Jin-young, it tells the story of a young taxi driver who moves into a dilapidated old apartment building, the site of a brutal tragedy thirty years earlier. The film has been nominated for and won several awards.

Plot
Looking for a new start, a young taxi driver moves into Apt. 504 of an old tenement named Migum Apartments. He soon finds that the previous tenant died mysteriously, and everyone on the floor is connected to the man.

After befriending the neighbor living a few doors down, he falls into an affair that sends them both down a dark path. But there's something else odd about the atmosphere in the run-down building. Does a ghost haunt those living here, or does the evil exist in those left alive?

Cast 
 Kim Myung-min as Yong-hyun
 Jang Jin-young as Sun-yeong
 Gi Ju-bong as writer Lee
 Jo An as Eun-soo
 Kim Gi-cheon
 Lee Han-wi
 Lee Kwang-gi
 Park Yeong-hoon
 Kim Joo-ryoung
 Kwon Tae-won
 Choi Woong as Writer Lee's son

Awards 
2001 Sitges Film Festival
 Best Actress: Jang Jin-young

2001 Busan Film Critics Awards
 Best New Actor: Kim Myung-min
 Best New Actress: Jang Jin-young

2001 Blue Dragon Film Awards
 Best Actress: Jang Jin-young

2001 Director's Cut Awards
 Best Actress: Jang Jin-young
 Best New Actor: Kim Myung-min

2002 Fantasporto International Fantasy Film
Best Actress: Jang Jin-young
Best Director: Yoon Jong-chan
Special Jury Award: Yoon Jong-chan

2002 Málaga International Week of Fantastic Cinema
 Best Actress: Jang Jin-young

Reception 
Dread Central wrote, "Sorum is definitely a slow burn", but called the film's "subtle horror" effective.

References

External links 
 
 
 
 

2001 films
South Korean horror films
2000s Korean-language films
2001 horror films
South Korean ghost films
2000s ghost films
Films directed by Yoon Jong-chan
2001 directorial debut films
2000s South Korean films